Terminal High Altitude Area Defense (THAAD), formerly Theater High Altitude Area Defense, is an American anti-ballistic missile defense system designed to shoot down short-, medium-, and intermediate-range ballistic missiles in their terminal phase (descent or reentry) by intercepting with a hit-to-kill approach. THAAD was developed after the experience of Iraq's Scud missile attacks during the Gulf War in 1991. The THAAD interceptor carries no warhead, instead relying on its kinetic energy of impact to destroy the incoming missile.

Originally a United States Army program, THAAD has come under the umbrella of the Missile Defense Agency. The Navy has a similar program, the sea-based Aegis Ballistic Missile Defense System, which also has a land component ("Aegis Ashore"). THAAD was originally scheduled for deployment in 2012, but initial deployment took place in May 2008. THAAD has been deployed in the United Arab Emirates, Israel, Romania, and South Korea.

On 17 January 2022, THAAD made its first operational interception, of an incoming medium-range ballistic missile in the UAE.

Development 

The THAAD missile defense concept was proposed in 1987, with a formal request for proposals submitted to industry in 1991. The THAAD program benefited from results of previous missile defense efforts like High Endoatmospheric Defense Interceptor (HEDI) and the Kinetic Kill Vehicle Integrated Technology Experiment (KITE). In September 1992, the US Army selected Lockheed (now Lockheed Martin) as prime contractor for THAAD development. Prior to development of a physical prototype, the Aero-Optical Effect (AOE) software code was developed to validate the intended operational profile of Lockheed's proposed design. The first THAAD flight test occurred in April 1995, with all flight tests in the demonstration-validation (DEM-VAL) program phase occurring at White Sands Missile Range. The first six intercept attempts missed the target (Flights 4–9). The first successful intercepts were conducted on 10 June 1999 and 2 August 1999, against Hera missiles.

The vulnerability and lethality analyses of THAAD have been conducted by the U.S. Army Research Laboratory (ARL). The vulnerability assessment for the THAAD featured an evaluation of the effects of major electromagnetic elements. This included EM interference, EM radiation operations, EM radiation hazards, EM pulse, electrostatic discharge, and lightning effects on components of the THAAD system.

The ARL assessments were designed to determine the THAAD system's growth potential given its tactical design as well as provide survivability analysis against threats such as conventional weapons, chemical weapons, and electronic warfare countermeasures. The data collected from the analyses were used to develop trajectory models for targets and missile as well as target trajectories using infrared scene generation of infrared countermeasures (IRCMs).

The THAAD system is being designed, built, and integrated by Lockheed Martin Missiles and Fire Control acting as prime contractor. Key subcontractors include Raytheon, Boeing, Aerojet Rocketdyne, Honeywell, BAE Systems, Oshkosh Defense, and MiltonCAT.

Demonstration and validation

Engineering and manufacturing 
In June 2000, Lockheed won the Engineering and Manufacturing Development (EMD) contract to turn the design into a mobile tactical army fire unit. Flight tests of this system resumed with missile characterization and full system tests in 2006 at White Sands Missile Range, then moved to the Pacific Missile Range Facility. The Interceptor was led through development and initial production by Tory Bruno, who later became CEO of United Launch Alliance.

THAAD-ER 
Lockheed is pushing for funding for the development of an extended-range (ER) version of the THAAD to counter maturing threats posed by hypersonic glide vehicles that adversaries may deploy, namely the Chinese WU-14, to penetrate the gap between low- and high-altitude missile defenses. The company performed static fire trials of a modified THAAD booster in 2006 and continued to fund the project until 2008. The current -diameter single-stage booster design would be expanded to a  first stage for greater range with a second "kick stage" to close the distance to the target and provide improved velocity at burnout and more lateral movement during an engagement. Although the kill vehicle would not need redesign, the ground-based launcher would have only five missiles instead of eight. As of 2020, THAAD-ER is only an industry concept, but Lockheed believes that the Missile Defense Agency will show interest because of the weapons under development by potential adversaries. If funding for the THAAD-ER begins in 2020, a system could be produced by 2024 to provide an interim capability against a rudimentary hypersonic threat. The Pentagon is researching whether other technologies like directed energy weapons and railguns are better solutions for missile defense; these are expected to become available in the mid to late 2020s.

Production 

Sometimes called Kinetic Kill technology, the THAAD missile destroys missiles by colliding with them, using hit-to-kill technology, like the MIM-104 Patriot PAC-3 (although the PAC-3 also contains a small explosive warhead). This is unlike the Patriot PAC-2 which carried only an explosive warhead detonated using a proximity fuze. Although the actual figures are classified, THAAD missiles have an estimated range of 125 miles (200 km), and can reach an altitude of 93 miles (150 km). A THAAD battery consists of at least six launcher vehicles, each equipped with eight missiles, with two mobile tactical operations centers (TOCs) and the AN/TPY-2 ground-based radar (GBR); the U.S. Army plans to field at least six THAAD batteries, at a purchase cost of US$800 million per battery. By September 2018 MDA plans to deliver 52 more interceptors to the Army. In June 2020 the Senate Armed Services Committee draft of the FY2021 DoD budget allocated funding for the eighth THAAD battery.

The THAAD missile is manufactured at a Lockheed Martin facility near Troy, Alabama. The facility performs final integration, assembly and testing of the THAAD missile. The THAAD Radar is an X-Band active electronically scanned array Radar developed and built by Raytheon at its Andover, Massachusetts Integrated Air Defense Facility. The THAAD radar and a variant developed as a forward sensor for ICBM missile defense, the Forward-Based X-Band – Transportable (FBX-T) radar, were assigned a common designator, AN/TPY-2, in late 2006/early 2007. The THAAD radar can interoperate with Aegis and Patriot systems, in a 3-layer antimissile defense.

First units equipped (FUE) 
On 28 May 2008, the U.S. Army activated Alpha Battery, 4th Air Defense Artillery Regiment (A-4), 11th Air Defense Artillery Brigade at Fort Bliss, Texas. Battery A-4 is part of the 32nd Army Air & Missile Defense Command. At the time, the battery had 24 THAAD interceptors, three THAAD launchers based on the M1120 HEMTT Load Handling System, a THAAD Fire Control and a THAAD radar. Full fielding began in 2009. On 16 October 2009, the U.S. Army and the Missile Defense Agency activated the second Terminal High Altitude Area Defense Battery, Alpha Battery, 2nd Air Defense Artillery Regiment (A-2), at Fort Bliss.

On 15 August 2012, Lockheed received a $150 million contract from the Missile Defense Agency (MDA) to produce THAAD Weapon System launchers and fire control and communications equipment for the U.S. Army. The contract included 12 launchers, two fire control and communications units, and support equipment. The contract provided six launchers for THAAD Battery 5 and an additional three launchers each to Batteries 1 and 2. These deliveries will bring all batteries to the standard six launcher configuration.

General missile defense plans
In May 2017, the Pentagon proposed spending $7.9 billion in its FY 2018 budget on missile defense which includes THAAD interceptors and Patriot interceptors, along with $1.5 billion for Ground-based Midcourse Defense (GMD) against intercontinental ballistic missiles.

Deployments

Israel
In March 2019, Bravo Battery, 2nd ADA Regiment (B-2 THAAD), 11th Air Defense Artillery Brigade was deployed at Nevatim Airbase during a joint US-Israeli drill, after which it was to be moved to an undisclosed location in the Negev desert in southern Israel. The X-Band radar system, which is part of the THAAD system, has been deployed at Nevatim since 2008.

In 2012, the U.S. AN/TPY-2 early missile warning radar station on Mt. Keren in the Negev desert was the only active foreign military installation in Israel.

Romania
In 2019, while the Aegis Ashore at NSF Deveselu was being upgraded, B Battery, 62nd Air Defense Artillery Regiment (B-62 THAAD), was emplaced in NSF Deveselu, Romania during the interim.

South Korea

On 17 October 2013, the South Korean military asked the Pentagon to provide information on the THAAD system concerning prices and capabilities as part of efforts to strengthen defenses against North Korean ballistic missiles. However, South Korean Park Geun-hye administration decided it will develop its own indigenous long-range surface-to-air missile instead of buying the THAAD. South Korean Defense Ministry officials previously requested information on the THAAD, as well as other missile interceptors like the Israeli Arrow 3, with the intention of researching systems for domestic technology development rather than for purchase. Officials did however state that American deployment of the THAAD system would help in countering North Korean missile threats. Later South Korea announced it would be deploying THAAD by the end of 2017. In May 2014, the Pentagon revealed it was studying sites to base THAAD batteries in South Korea.

The deployment was opposed by China and Russia. In February 2016, Chinese Foreign Minister Wang Yi expressed concerns that deployment of THAAD in South Korea, despite being directed at North Korea, could jeopardize China's "legitimate national security interests" and in 2017 the Vice Chairman of China's Central Military Commission asserted to the Chairman of the US Joint Chiefs of Staff that deployment of THAAD around China was one of the factors which had a negative influence on "bilateral military ties and mutual trust." The major controversy among Chinese officials is that they believe the purpose of the THAAD system, "which detects and intercepts incoming missiles at high altitudes, is actually to track missiles launched from China" not from North Korea. Chinese experts report that China is focused on the positioning of another THAAD radar system, this one on the Korean peninsula, for gleaning details about China's nuclear weapons delivery systems, such as THAAD's ability to distinguish which missiles might be carrying decoy warheads.  Bruce W. Bennett pointed out that China has deployed an S-400 missile system to the Shandong peninsula, between Pyongyang and Beijing, which appears to be a defense against North Korean missiles.

In July 2016, American and South Korean military officials agreed to deploy the THAAD missile defense system in the country to counter North Korea's growing threats and use of ballistic missile and nuclear tests; each THAAD unit consists of six truck-mounted launchers, 48 interceptors, a fire control and communications unit, and an AN/TPY-2 radar. Seongju County in North Gyeongsang Province was chosen as a THAAD site, partly because it is out of range of North Korean rocket artillery along the DMZ. This sparked protests from Seongju County residents, who feared that radiation emitted by the AN/TPY-2 radar would impact their health, and damage the region's famed oriental melon crop. On 30 September 2016, the U.S. and South Korea announced that THAAD would be relocated to Lotte Skyhill Seongju Country Club, farther from the town's main residential areas and higher in elevation, to alleviate concerns.

On 6 March 2017, two THAAD launcher trucks arrived by air transport at Osan Air Base South Korea, for a deployment.  Earlier that day, North Korea had launched 4 missiles.  A Reuters article stated that with the THAAD defense system, a North Korean missile barrage would still pose a threat to South Korea, while an article in the International Journal of Space Politics & Policy said that South Korean forces already possess Patriot systems for point defense and Aegis destroyers capable of stopping ballistic missiles that may come from the north, in a three-layer antimissile defense for South Korea.  On 16 March 2017, a THAAD radar arrived in South Korea. The THAAD system is kept at Osan Air Base until the site where the system is due to be deployed is prepared, with an expected ready date of June 2017.  Osan Air Base has blast-hardened command posts with 3 levels of blast doors.

By 25 April 2017, six trailers carrying the THAAD radar, interceptor launchers, communications, and support equipment entered the Seongju site.  On 30 April 2017, it was reported that South Korea would bear the cost of the land and facilities for THAAD, while the US will pay for operating it.  On 2 May 2017, Moon Sang-gyun, with the South Korean Defense Ministry, and Col. Robert Manning III, a spokesman for the U.S. military, announced that the THAAD system in Seongju is operational and "has the ability to intercept North Korean missiles and defend South Korea." It was reported that the system will not reach its full operational potential until later this year when additional elements of the system are onsite. On 7 June 2017 President Moon Jae-in suspended further THAAD deployment pending a review, after discovering four addition launchers had entered South Korea without the defense ministry informing him. The 35th Air Defense Artillery Brigade (United States) has integrated THAAD into its layered defense on the Korean Peninsula, denoted Combined Task Force Defender, composed of both US and ROK personnel.

Even in the face of a North Korean ICBM test on 4 July 2017, which newly threatens Alaska, a Kodiak, Alaska-based THAAD interceptor test (FTT-18) against a simulated attack by an Intermediate Range Ballistic Missile had long been planned. FTT-18 was successfully completed by Battery A-2 THAAD (Battery A, 2nd Air Defense Artillery Regiment, Terminal High Altitude Area Defense) of the 11th Air Defense Artillery Brigade (United States) on 11 July 2017. The soldiers used the procedures of an actual combat scenario and were not aware of the IRBM's launch time.

Also in 2017 another Kodiak launch of a THAAD interceptor was scheduled between 7:30PM and 1:30AM on Saturday 29 July, Sunday 30 July, or Monday 31 July, at alternative times, in preparation for a possible ICBM test by North Korea. On 28 July 2017 North Korea launched a test ICBM capable of reaching Los Angeles.  In response, President Moon Jae-in called for deployment of the four remaining THAAD launchers which were put on hold when he came to power. Lee Jong-kul, of South Korean President Moon Jae-in's Democratic Party of Korea states "The nuclear and missile capabilities of North Korea…have been upgraded to pose serious threats; the international cooperation system to keep the North in check has been nullified...", citing tensions over the U.S. deployment of the Terminal High Altitude Area Defense anti-missile system in South Korea. The Atlantic Council, in the June 2017 memorandum "Eliminating the Growing Threat Posed by North Korean Nuclear Weapons" to President Trump, recommends a checklist of actions, including the following declarations to North Korea.
 No use of WMDs, or it will result in a unified Korea under Seoul after the North's assured destruction.
 No export of nuclear equipment or fissile material; it will be intercepted, and the US will respond.
 No missile or missile test aimed at ROK (South Korea), Japan, or the US; it can then be shot down or pre-empted.

On 30 July 2017, a Kodiak-sited THAAD interceptor shot down an MRBM which launched over the Pacific Ocean, the 15th successful test; the Missile Defense Agency (MDA) director emphasized the data collection from the intercept, which enhances the modelling and scenario simulation capabilities of the MDA.  John Schilling estimates the current accuracy of the North's Hwasong-14 as poor at the mooted ranges which threaten US cities (which would require more testing to prove its accuracy).

On 11 August 2017, The New York Times reviewed the anti-missile options that are available to counter a planned salvo of four Hwasong-12 missiles, were they to be launched in mid-August 2017 from the North, and aimed to land just outside the territorial waters of Guam, a distance of 2100 miles, flying at altitudes exceeding 62 miles, in a flight of 1065 seconds. These options for the missile defense of South Korea include "sea-based, Patriots and THAAD" according to General John E. Hyten, commander of U.S. Strategic Command.

On 2 September 2017, the North Korean news agency KCNA released a photograph of an elongated payload, intended to fit in the warhead of one of its missiles. On 3 September 2017 both Japan's Foreign Ministry and the South Korean Joint Chiefs announced the detection of a magnitude 6.3 seismic event, centered near Punggye-ri, which is North Korea's underground nuclear test site. Japan's Foreign Ministry has concluded that the event was the North's sixth nuclear test. Choe Sang-hun of the New York Times reports that the test was a major embarrassment for China's Paramount leader Xi Jinping, who was hosting a BRICS summit (Brazil, Russia, India, China, and South Africa) in Xiamen, China. Cheng Xiaohe, an expert on North Korea at China's Renmin University, said the timing of the test appears to be deliberate. China's Foreign Ministry urged the North to "stop taking wrong actions", and agreed that further UN actions are needed to resolve the impending crisis. By creating a thermonuclear-capable payload for at least one of its missiles, the North has created a need for THAAD, which is capable of intercepting ICBM threats at the lower altitudes and ranges estimated for a Hwasong-14 ICBM subjected to the load of a heavier warhead needed to carry a thermonuclear weapon.

On 4 September 2017, BBC analyst Jonathan Marcus predicted a flood of several million refugees at the border of North Korea and China, were the North to be destroyed. China has positioned only two brigades at the border. Marcus points out that China and Russia have proposed the de-nuclearization of Korea and the replacement of the armistice with a peace treaty.

On 25 October 2017, Battery D, 2nd Air Defense Artillery Regiment, Terminal High Altitude Area Defense, reflagged with the 35th Air Defense Artillery Brigade in preparation for a permanent change of station to South Korea. In the interim before THAAD D-2's permanent transfer to South Korea with their families, THAAD Battery A-4 will deploy to South Korea.

The South Korean decision to deploy THAAD to protect itself against North Korea caused backlash and retaliation measures from China.

On 30 October 2017, South Korea and China agreed to normalize relations, which had rifted due to THAAD deployment.

Turkey
According to U.S. officials the AN/TPY-2 radar was deployed at Turkey's Kürecik Air Force base. The radar was activated in January 2012.

United Arab Emirates
The United Arab Emirates (UAE) signed a deal to purchase the missile defense system on 25 December 2011. The United Arab Emirates (UAE) graduated its first two THAAD unit classes at Fort Bliss in 2015 and 2016. Its first live-fire exercises with Patriot missiles took place in 2014.

On 17 January 2022, THAAD made its first real-world intercept against an incoming Houthi ballistic missile in the UAE.

United States

Hawaii

In June 2009, the United States deployed a THAAD unit to Hawaii, along with the SBX sea-based radar, to defend against a possible North Korean launch targeting the archipelago.

Guam
In April 2013, the United States declared that Alpha Battery, 4th Air Defense Artillery Regiment (A-4), would be deployed to Guam to defend against a possible North Korean IRBM attack targeting the island. In March 2014, Alpha Battery, 2nd ADA RGT (A-2), did a change of responsibility with A-4 and took over the Defense of Guam Mission. After a successful 12-month deployment by A-4, Delta 2 (D-2) took its place for a 12-month deployment.
In 2018-2019 Echo Battery, 3rd ADA Regiment (E-3) deployed to Guam.

Wake Island

On 1 November 2015, a THAAD system was a key component of Campaign Fierce Sentry Flight Test Operational-02 Event 2 (FTO-02 E2), a complex $230 million missile defense system test event conducted at Wake Island and the surrounding ocean areas. The objective was to test the ability of the Aegis Ballistic Missile Defense and THAAD Weapon Systems to defeat a raid of three near-simultaneous air and missile targets, consisting of one medium-range ballistic missile, one short-range ballistic missile and one cruise missile target. During the test, a THAAD system on Wake Island detected and destroyed a short-range target simulating a short-range ballistic missile that was launched by parachute ejected from a C-17 transport plane. At the same time, the THAAD system and the USS John Paul Jones guided missile destroyer both launched missiles to intercept a medium-range ballistic missile, launched by parachute from a second C-17.

Future deployments: firm orders and possible plans

Europe and the Middle East
By March 2016, Army Space and Missile Defense Command was considering THAAD deployments to Europe with EUCOM and the Middle East with CENTCOM.

Japan
In November 2015, Japanese Defense Minister Gen Nakatani said he would consider the U.S. deploying the THAAD in Japan to counter the threat of North Korean ballistic missiles.  By October 2016, Japan was considering procuring either THAAD or Aegis Ashore to add a new missile defense layer. In May 2017 it was reported that Japan government officials now favor the Aegis Ashore system as it comes with a wider coverage area, which would mean fewer units needed to protect Japan, and it is also cheaper.

At the Center for a New American Security 2017 conference, citing publicly available sources and simulations of strikes against US bases in Asia, two Navy Fellows, Commanders Shugart and Gonzalez, USN noted that two more Patriot batteries, two more Aegis ships, and five more THAAD batteries would counter China's published SRBM (short-range) and MRBM (medium-range) capabilities against Japan.

Russia has opposed the missile acquisitions and fears that the US will have access to the management of Aegis Ashore missile defense complexes after their deployment in Japan. Russia has data that missile defense systems will have shock capabilities. "We do not know of any cases anywhere in the world when the United States deployed its weapons and transferred control over them to the country in whose territory it all happened." I very much doubt that they will make an exception and in this case, "- concluded the Russian Foreign Minister.

Oman
On 27 May 2013, Oman announced a deal for the acquisition of the THAAD air defense system. However, a sale has not been announced.

Saudi Arabia
On 6 October 2017, the US reached a deal to provide Saudi Arabia with THAAD in a deal worth $15 billion. Seven fire units each with a Raytheon AN/TPY-2 radar, two mobile tactical stations (with two spares for a total of 16), and six launchers (with two spares for a total of 44), 360 interceptor missiles.

Taiwan

In 2017, a Hong Kong–based media report claimed that THAAD could be deployed in Taiwan to intercept People's Republic of China missiles. However, Taiwan's Foreign Minister, David Lee, has said he is unaware of any talks with the US about possible deployment. Local military experts have said that it was neither necessary, nor affordable for Taiwan to deploy THAAD because China is threatening Taiwan with short-range missiles, whereas THAAD is designed to shoot down medium and long-range missiles. The Minister of National Defense, Feng Shih-kuan, said in March 2017 that he was firmly opposed to the deployment of a THAAD system in Taiwan although comments made by Feng's deputy minister Cheng De-mei during a Foreign Affairs and National Defense Committee Q&A session that was held in April 2017 in which he said that Taiwan did not need a THAAD system in the short term because its US-made phased-array radar system at Hsinchu County’s Leshan base was on par with the THAAD system in terms of detection capability was described as "in slight contrast with Minister of National Defense Feng Shih-kuan’s last month." It was reported that Freddy Lim urged the ministry during the same Q&A session "to procure whatever is necessary to ensure the nation’s defense capabilities, which could not be compromised due to China’s pressure."

Taiwan's tracking data from its early warning system, built by the manufacturer of the THAAD radar, can serve to counter China's missile launches.

In response, retired Chinese general Wang Hongguang warned that if Taiwan were to start deploying THAAD systems, then the People's Liberation Army would start the process to conquer Taiwan.

Operators

See also 
 Arrow (Israeli missile)
 HQ-19, developed by China
 Prithvi Defence Vehicle - Indian high altitude anti-ballistic missile system
 M1120 HEMTT Load Handling System (launcher)
 NASAMS, developed by Norway, in use by Spain and US
 S-300VM, developed by Russia
 S-400 missile system, developed by Russia
 S-500 missile system, developed by Russia
 Taiwan Sky Bow Ballistic Missile Defense System
 L-SAM, developed by South Korea
 High Endoatmospheric Defense Interceptor
 XRSAM, under development by India

References

External links

 Lockheed Martin THAAD web page
 MDA THAAD page
 THAAD program details
 THAAD program history on, designation-systems.net
 TPY-2 X-band Radar on Missile Threat CSIS site

DEM-VAL and EMD testing
 THAAD First Successful Intercept, 10 June 1999
 THAAD Second Successful Intercept, 2 August 1999
 THAAD Equipment Arrives in Hawaii, 18 October 2006
 Successful THAAD Radar Target Tracking Test, 8 March 2007
 THAAD Radar Supports Successful Aegis BMD Intercept, 22 June 2007

Missile Defense Agency
Missile defense
Anti-aircraft warfare
Anti-ballistic missiles of the United States
Surface-to-air missiles of the United States
Lockheed Martin
Boeing
Honeywell
BAE Systems
Raytheon Company
Rocketdyne
Anti-South Korean sentiment in China
Military equipment introduced in the 2000s
Israel–United States military relations
South Korea–United States military relations
Romania–United States military relations
United Arab Emirates–United States relations